Martín Pedro Zabalúa Marramoti, known as Tincho Zabala (4 February 1923 in Montevideo — 23 February 2001 in Buenos Aires) was a Uruguayan actor. He was active in radio, television and movies from his debut radio broadcast in 1937 for almost 60 years.  His filmography includes more than 40 films.

Selected filmography
 La pérgola de las flores (1965)

Sources

1923 births
2001 deaths
Male actors from Montevideo
Uruguayan expatriate actors in Argentina
Uruguayan male film actors
Argentine comedians
Uruguayan male comedians
Burials at La Chacarita Cemetery
20th-century Uruguayan male actors
20th-century comedians